Peter Abum Sarkodie is a Ghanaian politician of the Republic of Ghana. He was the Member of Parliament representing Mampong constituency of the Ashanti Region of Ghana in the 4th Parliament of the 4th Republic of Ghana. He is a member of the New Patriotic Party.

Early life and education 
Sarkodie was born on December 12, 1961. He is a product of the University of Cape Coast (UCC). He holds a Bachelor of Science degree in education from the university.

Career 
Sarkodie is lecturer.

Political career 
Sarkodie is a member of the New Patriotic Party. He became a member of parliament from January 2005 after emerging winner in the General Election in December 2004. He was elected as the member of parliament for the Mampong constituency in the fourth parliament of the fourth Republic of Ghana.

Elections 
Sarkodie was elected as the member of parliament for the Mampong constituency of the Ashanti Region of Ghana for the first time in the 2004 Ghanaian general elections. He won on the ticket of the New Patriotic Party. His constituency was a part of the 36 parliamentary seats out of 39 seats won by the New Patriotic Party in that election for the Ashanti Region. The New Patriotic Party won a majority total of 128 parliamentary seats out of 230 seats.  He was elected with 28,997 votes out of 36,648 total valid votes cast. This was equivalent to 79.1% of total valid votes cast. He was elected over Mohammed Issahaku of the Peoples’ National Convention, Daniel Ohyeamang Appau of the National Democratic Congress, Kwaku Duah Agyemang of the Convention People's Party and Bashir Kassim of the Democratic People's Party. These obtained 226, 6,921, 374 and 130 votes respectively of total votes cast. These were equivalent to 0.6%, 18.9%, 1.0%  and 0.4% respectively of total valid votes cast.

Personal life 
Sarkodie is a Christian.

See also 
 List of MPs elected in the 2004 Ghanaian parliamentary election

References 

Living people
Ghanaian MPs 2005–2009
New Patriotic Party politicians
University of Cape Coast alumni
1961 births